Robertus riparius is a species of cobweb spider in the family Theridiidae. It is found in the United States and Canada.

References

Theridiidae
Articles created by Qbugbot
Spiders described in 1886
Spiders of North America